Trigonopterus pauxillus is a species of flightless weevil in the genus Trigonopterus from Indonesia.

Etymology
The specific name is derived from the Latin word pauxillus, meaning "small". It refers to the species small size.

Description
Individuals measure 1.65–2.01 mm in length.  General coloration black, with rust-colored tarsi and antennae.

Range
The species is found around elevations of  around Batu Dulang and Tepal on the island of Sumbawa, part of the Indonesian province of West Nusa Tenggara.

Phylogeny
T. pauxillus is part of the T. relictus species group.

References

pauxillus
Beetles described in 2014
Beetles of Asia
Insects of Indonesia